Pelodytes hespericus, the Hesperides' parsley frog,  is a species of frog in the family Pelodytidae, This species is only found in Spain. It is a poorly known species.

Distribution and habitat
The Hesperides' parsley frog is endemic to Spain. This species is found mostly in mid-elevation montane regions of eastern and central Spain.

References

Pelodytes
Amphibians described in 2017
Amphibians of Europe